Pat Nelson may refer to:
Pat Nelson (Alberta politician)
Pat Nelson (Mississippi politician)